Nargis Bagheri is an Indian actress and singer who acted in Bollywood and Kollywood films and sang for a Bollywood film.

Biography
Bagheri hails from Pune. Garam Masala was her debut film which was released in 2005. Her Kollywood film Ninaithale was released in 2007. Her next Bollywood film Pranali: The Tradition was released in 2008. Then, her film Morning Walk was released in 2009. In this film, she also sang a song titled "Nach Le". Her last film was Kushti was released in 2010.

Filmography

References

External links
 

Living people
Indian film actresses
Actresses in Hindi cinema
Actresses from Pune
Indian women playback singers
Bollywood playback singers
Singers from Pune
Actresses in Tamil cinema
1984 births